Naked in the Sun is a 1957 American Western film directed by R. John Hugh and written by John Cresswell. It is based on the 1956 novel The Warrior by Frank G. Slaughter. The film stars James Craig, Lita Milan, Barton MacLane, Dennis Cross, Robert Wark and Jim Boles. The film was released on September 20, 1957, by Allied Artists Pictures.

Plot

Cast        
James Craig as Chief Osceola
Lita Milan as Chechotah
Barton MacLane as Wilson
Dennis Cross as Coacoochee
Robert Wark as Major Francis Dade
Jim Boles as Arthur Gillis
Doug Wilson as Captain Pace
Peter Dearing as General Finch
Tony Morris as Micanopah
Mike Recco as Amanthla
Tony Hunter as Captain in Dade's column
Bill Armstrong as Lieutenant in Dade's column

References

External links
 

1957 films
1950s English-language films
American Western (genre) films
1957 Western (genre) films
Allied Artists films
Films scored by Laurence Rosenthal
1950s American films